Shotgun Singer is an album by American singer/songwriter Kris Delmhorst, released in 2008.

History
Delmhorst recorded Shotgun Singer in a rural cabin with minimal recording gear by herself. Once completed, she brought in various players to add to the songs, including her husband Jeffrey Foucault and friend and label-mate Peter Mulvey. Those three had previously released Redbird together five years earlier.

Reception

Joe Vigilione of Allmusic wrote "... anyone dipping into a song like "Freediver" or any other random track on this disc is bound to be quite surprised at the extraordinary depth inside."

The Boston Herald stated in their review: "Perennial Boston Music Award nominee Delmhorst makes a stunning transformation by moving from the countrified folk of her previous three releases to a dreamier and denser sound brimming with atmosphere and muted-but-infectious melodies... Shotgun Singer is a work of lo-fi beauty, and evidence of an artist taking flight."

Track listing 
All songs by Kris Delmhorst.
"Blue Adeline" – 4:28
"Heavens Hold the Sun" – 3:43
"To the Wire" – 4:02
"Midnight Ringer" – 4:13
"If Not for Love" – 3:27
"Riverwide" – 4:19
"1000 Reasons" – 4:33
"Birds of Belfast" – 4:57
"Oleander" – 3:05
"Kiss It Away" – 3:14
"Freediver" – 4:02
"Brand New Sound" – 3:26

Personnel
Kris Delmhorst – vocals, acoustic and electric guitar, organ, piano, cello, tambourine, mandolin, bass, vibraphone, keyboards, Fender Rhondes
Jeffrey Foucault – acoustic guitar, banjo, slide guitar
David "Goody" Goodrich – guitar loops
Sam Kassirer – organ, piano, percussion, keyboards, vibraphone, Fender Rhodes
Erin McKeown – requinto
Peter Mulvey – electric guitar

Production
 Produced by Kris Delmhorst and Sam Kassirer
 Engineered by Danny Bernini, Justin Pizzoferrato, Andy Pinkham and Sam Kassirer
 Mastered by Jeff Lipton
 Mixed by Kristen Smith
 Photography by Jon Strymish, Jeffrey Foucault and Kris Delmhorst
 Design by Paul Fucik

References

External links
Official Kris Delmhorst website
Signature Sounds Recordings

2008 albums
Kris Delmhorst albums